Bakeys (sometimes also known as Bakey's) is an Indian edible cutlery manufacturing startup company based in Hyderabad, Telangana. Bakeys was founded in 2010 by former ICRISAT researcher Narayana Peesapaty as an eco-friendly alternative to disposable utensils prepared with plastic, wood and bamboo, such as bamboo chopsticks.

Out of business
Since 2017 the Kickstarter linked to the business has not been updated due to complications and fraud, as stated in this newspaper.

Products
Bakeys uses different types of flours to bake single-use edible spoons, forks and chopsticks which can be consumed after their intended use. Since 2010, it has sold more than 1.5 million pieces of cutlery throughout India. As of April 2016, the company only markets edible spoons, but has plans to expand its operations to begin distribution of forks and chopsticks with income from a Kickstarter funding campaign. As of April 2016, the company only ships its products within India.

The products are vegetarian, and are manufactured using with all-natural ingredients, (primarily) sorghum (jowar), and other types of flours such as wheat, rice, and millet. The spoons have a shelf-life of 24 months and are so made that they will naturally decompose between 3 and 7 days after use if not consumed. The spoons are manufactured in several flavors, such as cumin, mint-ginger, carrot-beetroot and sugar.

History
Bakeys was founded by Narayana Peesapathy in 2010 in Hyderabad. Following this support, the company started a Kickstarter campaign to increase its reach. In April 2016, the company had 30 employees. As of May 2017 the company had not yet started shipping to backers of the Kickstarter campaign, though shipments of the spoons to customers in India has continued without issue.

References

External links
 

Food and drink companies of India
Indian brands
Manufacturing companies based in Hyderabad, India
Indian companies established in 2010
Waste minimisation
2010 establishments in Andhra Pradesh
Food and drink companies established in 2010